Aero Tropical, also known as Air Tropical, was an airline based in Angola. It was founded in 1996 and shut down in 1999.

Accidents and Incidents
On 27 February 1996 at 05:40 local time, an Aero Tropical Antonov An-12 cargo aircraft (registered ER-ACE) crashed during a poor-visibility approach into Lucapa Airport following a flight from Luanda. All eight persons aboard the aircraft were killed.

References

Airlines established in 1996
Airlines disestablished in 1999
Defunct airlines of Angola
1996 establishments in Angola
1999 disestablishments in Angola